Sabot de Frotey National Nature Reserve is a national nature reserve located in Vesoul, France.

Geography of Haute-Saône
Nature reserves in France
Protected areas established in 1971
Tourist attractions in Haute-Saône
Vesoul